Vallea ecuadorensis is a species of tree in the Elaeocarpaceae family. Although formerly considered endemic to Ecuador it has also been collected in Bolivia and Peru.  This species occurs in subtropical or tropical moist montane forests, at 2500 – 3500 meters above sea level.

References

Elaeocarpaceae
Near threatened plants
Trees of Ecuador
Trees of Peru
Trees of Bolivia
Taxonomy articles created by Polbot